A Question of Adultery (U.S. title: The Case of Mrs. Loring) is a 1958 British drama film directed by Don Chaffey and starring Julie London and Anthony Steel.

The film was reportedly based on the 1948 play A Breach of Marriage by Dan Sutherland.  A novelisation of the film was written by Gordon Wellesley.

The controversial nature of the film led to it being given an X rating in the UK and rated "Condemned" by the US Roman Catholic Legion of Decency, leading to the film being delayed for release in the United States.

Plot
Racing car driver Mark Loring, the heir to the Loring fortune, complements his competitive spirit with jealousy of his wife Mary.  Enraged by the attention shown to her by a "fan" during an evening at a restaurant, the couple is greeted by longtime friends of Mark's family, who invites them to join them at their table. Mark declines, but relents by saying, "just one drink".

After divulging to Mary that Mark's mother was a singer who walked out on the family when Mark "was a baby", Mrs. Duncan asks Mary (who, too, was a singer), to sing a favorite old song. Mark tells Mary not to, and that he "won't have it", but she defies Mark and does. Miffed, Mark purposely does not light Mary's cigarette, upon which she retaliates by leaning over exposing her cleavage to Mr. Duncan, who delightedly obliges.

Seconds later, Mary runs to the beach and Mark follows. He asks her what the devil is she trying to do to him, and proceeds to make angry and fiery love to her. After their reconciliation from the night before, Mark once again becomes jealous when Mary receives a call from her "fan" who wants to return her dropped glove form the previous day's race. Mark pouts that he "doesn't care to share her, he never seems to have her to himself, and there's always something – somebody". With that, Mark decides to whisk American Mary away, home to London.

During their drive, Mary tells Mark that she is going to have a baby, and Mark replies, "ours, I hope". Mary slaps Mark and they get into an accident. While recovering in separate rooms, Mark's father tells him that Mary lost their unborn child; the doctor informs Mary that Mark is sterile. When the couple comes together, they console each other, however, Mark is unaware of his condition. Mark's father anticipates and hopes the "affair" will end, and attempts to buy Mary off. She, however, holds firm and tells Sir John Loring she's not for sale, that she and her husband need to be alone, and what Mark doesn't know is that his father is his enemy.

Upon telling Mark she wants a baby, Mary learns that Mark's father later revealed to him that he is sterile. She comes up with the idea of artificial insemination and attempts to resolve their difficulties by travelling with him to a clinic in Switzerland. Soon pregnant, and though Mark had initially agreed, he becomes alienated from the idea when he becomes convinced Mary is having an affair with a local skier who helps her to his cabin after she injures her ankle on the slopes.

Returning to London alone, Mark and his father take Mary to court for divorce on the charge of artificial insemination being a case of adultery. Undeterred, Mary decides to fight to preserve the reputation of her unborn child, and to confirm why another child would bring the two closer together; she only wanted her husband's love – although the prosecution cried material benefit to Mrs. Lording.

During proceedings, Mary's attorney encouraged her to continue when she wanted to quit. He needed her permission to re-examine her husband's character (jealousy). Upon cross-examination, Mark's personality was brought into clear view; establishing that he didn't like Mary being civil, accepting a light from a friend, singing in a nightclub, or offers of hospitality when there was no other alternative. It was established that Mark was jealous from the very outset of the marriage and that the divorce proceedings were motivated purely and simply by his unreasonable and uncontrollable jealousy.

Mark was also reminded that he made a spectacle of his wife during the Iberian Gran Prix. At the Hotel Playa, he forced himself on his wife while other eyes were watching from a terrace overlooking the public beach – even though he was aware, yet his wife unwilling. Mark's actions were further put on trial when it was noted that he told his wife he would "make up" their loss of the baby, that he signed a document agreeing to wife's treatment of artificial insemination, but later changed his mind (without saying so), and he made love to her after she first told him she was pregnant. This proved he condoned and accepted her "condition".

Sir John was also cross-examined about his feelings and objections (similar to those he felt of his former wife) toward his son's showbiz/theater/singer wife, where it was uncovered that a bribe was offered. Sir John claimed he was protecting his son by informing him of his sterility, his passing infatuation with his wife, and the protection of the Loring Estate. In deep contemplation after the senior Loring's testimony, Mark exited the courtroom for a cigarette, without a word to his father.

Dr. Cameron was next to defend his position. The prosecution's claim of "technical adultery" by artificial insemination was struck down as not being adultery at all. Producing a baby "artificially" via "test tube" and not via intercourse was not the same as adultery. Moreover, the definition of adultery also negated the very act of which Mary was accused.

In the end, Mark stands up to his father, finally realizing he's made a mess of his marriage and recognizing his father as the controlling figure who is playing God. He walks out, telling his father there will be no more dinners. Back at court, Dieter offers his assistance to Mary, if ever in need. Mark and Mary meet while waiting the decision; he tells her he will always love her.

The verdict could not be read, as the jurors could never agree. Mark refuses a retrial and says he was completely wrong and should never "have brought it".  Through his attorney, Mark begs the court's indulgence, apologizes for the trouble he has caused, withdrawals the charges, and ask the judge to dismiss the petition.

The response: "I find this an imminently most satisfactory ending". The closing shot is of Mark waiting for and receiving Mary as they walk together, with "Strange Affair" playing in the background.

Cast
 Julie London as Mary Loring
 Anthony Steel as Mark Loring
 Basil Sydney as Sir John Loring
 Donald Houston as Mr. Jacobus
 Anton Diffring as Carl Dieter
 Andrew Cruickshank as Dr. Cameron
 Frank Thring as Mr. Stanley  
 Conrad Phillips as Mario  
 Kynaston Reeves as Judge  
 Mary Mackenzie as Nurse Parsons
 Georgina Cookson as Mrs. Duncan  
 Richard Caldicot as Mr. Duncan
 John Rae as Jury Foreman
 Sam Kydd as Court Reporter

Production
It was the first movie about artificial insemination. It was produced by Raymond Stross, who had just enjoyed box office success with The Flesh Is Weak, the story of prostitution, directed by Don Chaffey.

The film was announced in August 1957. It was reportedly based on an original story by Anne Edwards, written with producer Raymond Stross. The film was approved "in principle" by the Production Code, but final approval had to be given on seeing the final movie. The title came about because British courts at the time regarded artificial insemination as adultery.

The original stars were to be Julie London and John Cassavetes.

In October, Rick Jason was offered the male lead, but he turned it down. Eventually, Anthony Steel was cast. Filming began in England in November 1957 at Elstree Studios. The film was also known during production as My Strange Affair, the title of a song that London sings in the film.

Producer Raymond Stross described it as "a very clean film that is accurate and authentic." The film was to be released on a special handling basis by Theatrical Presentations. Part of the finance came from American Joe Harris' Essex Company.

Soundtrack
"My Strange Affair"
music and lyrics by Bobby Troup
sung by Julie London

Reception
Variety called it "a soggy novelitish affair" in which "stilted dialogue and a screenplay that sits firmly on the fence has resulted in a subject of some significance being wasted."

Filmink called it "a fascinatingly odd courtroom drama about artificial insemination, with Steel as a possessive infertile racing car driver married to Julie London, roused to jealousy at the thought of someone else impregnating her. Frank Thring is superb as a barrister, London sings a random song, and there's a sequence where Steel ravishes London on a Spanish beach intercut with a flamenco performer; Steel is quite effective as a man tormented by his lack of potency."

The film was released in Los Angeles in April 1959. The Los Angeles Times said the film "appears to be more sensational than it really is."

The New York Times said "the film's extensive discussion of the problem seems, at best, superfluous."

References

External links

A Question of Adultery at BFI

1958 films
Films directed by Don Chaffey
British drama films
1958 drama films
British black-and-white films
British films based on plays
1950s English-language films
1950s British films